Dosh or DOSH may refer to:

 Mary Lucy Dosh (1839-1861), American Roman Catholic nun and nurse
 Dosh (musician) (born 1972), American musician
 Dosh (album)
 Deoxysarpagine hydroxylase, an enzyme
 Kariel Gardosh (1921–2000), Israeli cartoonist and illustrator
 Money: a UK slang term
 California Occupational Safety and Health Administration, sometimes known as the Division of Occupational Safety and Health (DOSH)